Corso Salani (9 September 1961, in Florence – 16 June 2010, in Ostia) was an Italian director, screenwriter and actor.

The cause of his death was a sudden illness while walking along the seafront in Ostia with his wife Margaret.

Filmography

As Actor
 The Week of the Sphinx (1990)
 The Invisible Wall (1991)
 Nel Continente nero  (1992)
 The End is Known (1992)
 The Wind, in the Evening (2004)
 Piano, solo (2007)
 The Rage (2008) 
 Il mostro di Firenze (2009)
 Dark Love (2010)

As Director
 Mirna (2009)
 Il peggio di noi (2006)
 Corrispondenze private(2003)
 Occidente (2000)
 Gli occhi stanchi (1995)
 Gli ultimi giorni (1992)
 Voci d'Europa (1989)

As Writer
 Il peggio di noi (2006)
 Corrispondenze private (2003)
 Occidente(2000)
 Gli ultimi giorni (1992)
 Voci d'Europa (1989)

References

External links
 

1961 births
2010 deaths
Italian screenwriters
Italian male screenwriters
Italian male actors